Sébastien Frangolacci (born March 31, 1976) is a French volleyball player, who won the bronze medal with the France men's national volleyball team at the 2002 World Championship. He was part of French squad at the 2004 Olympics.

References
 at sports references

1976 births
Living people
Volleyball players at the 2004 Summer Olympics
Olympic volleyball players of France
French men's volleyball players